Sherman "Shay" Minton (October 20, 1890 – April 9, 1965) was an American politician and jurist who served as a U.S. senator from Indiana and later became an associate justice of the Supreme Court of the United States; he was a member of the Democratic Party.

After attending college and law school, Minton served as a captain in World War I, following which he launched a legal and political career. In 1930, after multiple failed election attempts, and serving as a regional leader in the American Legion, he became a utility commissioner under the administration of Paul V. McNutt, Governor of Indiana. Four years later, Minton was elected to the United States Senate. During the campaign, he defended New Deal legislation in a series of addresses in which he suggested it was not necessary to uphold the United States Constitution during the Great Depression. Minton's campaign was denounced by his political opponents, and he received more widespread criticism for an address that became known as the "You Cannot Eat the Constitution" speech. As part of the New Deal Coalition, Minton championed President Franklin D. Roosevelt's unsuccessful court packing plans in the Senate and became one of his top Senate allies.

After Minton failed in his 1940 Senate reelection bid, Roosevelt appointed him as a United States circuit judge of the United States Court of Appeals for the Seventh Circuit. After Roosevelt's death, President Harry S. Truman, who had developed a close friendship with Minton during their time together in the Senate, nominated him to the Supreme Court. He was confirmed by the Senate on October 4, 1949, by a vote of 48 to 16, 15 Republicans and one Democrat (Harry Flood Byrd of Virginia) voting against him. He served on the Supreme Court for seven years. An advocate of judicial restraint, Minton was a regular supporter of the majority opinions during his early years on the Court; he became a regular dissenter after President Dwight Eisenhower's appointees altered the court's composition. In 1956, poor health forced Minton to retire, after which he traveled and lectured until his death in 1965. As of 2023, he is the last member of the United States Congress to be named to the Supreme Court.

According to historians, Minton's judicial philosophy was largely a reaction to the relationship between the New Deal senators and the conservative 1930s Court, which ruled much of the New Deal legislation unconstitutional. Minton believed the Supreme Court should be more deferential to the political branches of government, and supported a broad interpretation of the powers of Congress. He generally opposed any effort to rule federal legislation unconstitutional on the principle that the court was overstepping its authority. As a result of his judicial philosophy, he sought to uphold the intent of the political branches of government. Historians note the unusual contrast this created between his role as a partisan liberal Senator and his role as a conservative jurist. When Minton became a Justice, the Senate had become more conservative, leading Minton to uphold the constitutionality and intention of conservative legislation. He often played peacemaker and consensus builder during a period when the Court was riven by feuds. He generally ruled in favor of order over freedom as a result of his broad interpretation of governmental powers. These rulings and their limited impact gave some historians a negative opinion of his judicial record. Other historians consider Minton's strong commitment to his judicial principles laudable. In 1962, the Sherman Minton Bridge in southern Indiana and the Minton-Capehart Federal Building in Indianapolis were named in his honor.

Early life

Family and background

Minton was born on October 20, 1890, to John Evan and Emma Livers Minton, in their Georgetown, Indiana, home. He was the third of the family's five children and was nicknamed Shay because of his younger brother's inability to properly pronounce "Sherman". Minton's paternal grandfather, Jonathan Minton, was killed during the American Civil War and his father grew up on his own. Minton's parents married in 1883.

Minton received his basic education in a two-room schoolhouse in Georgetown he attended through eighth grade. He was exposed to politics from an early age; his father took him to several political rallies, including an 1895 speech by Democratic Party leader William Jennings Bryan. His father was a day laborer for the New Albany and St. Louis Air Line Railway. In 1898, he became disabled when he suffered heat stroke while working. His condition meant he could not work; the family became impoverished and had to subsist on the limited yield of their small farm. Minton's mother developed breast cancer in 1899. A traveling doctor attempted to remove her tumors in April 1900, performing the operation with her laid on the family dinner table, but she died during the procedure. The death was an emotional blow to Minton; thereafter, he refused to attend church and spoke against God, whom he blamed for his mother's death. Minton's father married Sarah Montague on December 3, 1901.

As Minton grew older, he was frequently in trouble with people in his neighborhood. In 1904 he was arrested for disregarding a town ordinance forbidding bicyclists to ride on the sidewalk. He was taken before a justice of the peace and fined three dollars, an incident he later credited with changing his outlook on life and sparking his desire to become a lawyer. To accomplish that, and continue supporting his family, he traveled with his older brother Herbert to Fort Worth, Texas, to take a job at the Swift & Company meatpacking plant. His father and younger siblings soon joined him there after the two brothers' income was able to cover their expenses. After saving enough money to help establish the family in a new home, Minton returned to Indiana to attend high school, leaving his family in Texas.

Education

Minton started at Edwardsville High School in 1905, aged 14. The next year the school merged with nearby New Albany High School. There he participated in the football, baseball, and track teams. He founded the school's first debate club, the Wranglers, which won several awards. He worked in a local arcade, and during summer vacations returned to Fort Worth to work at the Swift plant. He was briefly expelled from school after committing a prank in February 1908. The school was under the guidance of the innovative Superintendent Charles Allen Prosser, who let Minton return only after he formally apologized before the entire school a week later. Minton began dating Gertrude Gurtz in his senior year, and the two remained in regular correspondence after he left for college. He graduated high school at the top of his class in 1910.

Minton was intent on attending college; during the summer of 1910, he took a job as a Swift Company salesman in the Fort Worth area to help pay his way. He returned to Indiana and enrolled at Indiana University Bloomington in September 1911, taking enough classes to complete his first three years of courses in two years. Despite the heavy workload, he joined the school's baseball and debate teams, and participated in the Jackson Club, an organization for Democrats. His college years had significant influence on his future political career. He became friends with future Governor of Indiana Paul V. McNutt, future presidential candidate Wendell L. Willkie, and several other men who became influential in the state. During his second year he ran out of money, but could not return to Texas to earn more because of his class schedule. He lodged in the Phi Delta Theta (ΦΔΘ) international fraternity house and subsisted mostly on wild berries, leftover bread from the cafeteria and free milk. He completed undergraduate school at the top of his class in 1913. In 1915 he graduated from the Indiana University School of Law in Bloomington, at what is now known as the Indiana University Maurer School of Law. During law school, he played end and fullback for the Indiana University football team.

Minton ranked first in his class. This placement entitled him to serve as librarian at the legal college. The position paid a fair salary and allowed him to live more comfortably for his last two years of school. He graduated from law school in 1915—again at the top of his class—and won a one-year scholarship to take post-graduate courses at Yale Law School, where he earned a Master of Laws degree. At Yale he focused on studying constitutional law and attended the regular lectures of former President and future Chief Justice of the United States William Howard Taft. His LL.M. thesis was titled "Theory of the Action." Taft said that Minton's post-graduate thesis was among the best he had ever read. Along with Lewis F. Powell Jr., Minton is one of two United States Supreme Court justices to have earned an LL.M. degree. Minton continued to improve his oratory and debate at Yale; he won the Wayland Club prize for extemporaneous public speaking, and helped organize the university's legal aid society.

Legal career and World War I

In May 1916, Minton returned to New Albany, where he opened a law practice and renewed his relationship with Gurtz. He took several cases and gained experience working pro bono to assist the local county prosecutor. He joined the Chautauqua lecture circuit, and traveled to several cities to give speeches. During one lecture circuit, he met William Jennings Bryan, who advised Minton about politics, inspiring him to consider a career in public life.

In 1917, just after the United States declared war on Germany and entered World War I, Minton enlisted in the United States Army. He took an officers training course at Fort Benjamin Harrison in hope of earning a commission, but was not among those chosen to become an officer. In August he was granted a brief leave of absence; he returned to New Albany, where he married Gurtz on August 11. He returned to camp in September and requested to repeat his training course, still hoping to receive a commission; after finishing the training he was commissioned as a captain. The American Expeditionary Forces, Eighty-fourth Division, to which Minton belonged, was dispatched to France in July 1918. Minton and his unit served on the Western Front at Verdun, Soissons, and later protecting supply lines in Belgium. During most of his time in the war, his unit was responsible for scouting roads to ensure safe transport of men and supplies to the front lines. He saw no combat.

When President Woodrow Wilson came to Paris in 1919, Minton was in charge of a security detail guarding the negotiation hall and met him. When the war ended, Minton remained briefly with the Army of Occupation in Germany before being discharged in August 1919. He chose to remain in Paris for several months to study Roman law, international law, civil law and jurisprudence at the University of Paris. He returned home in March 1920. The first of Minton's three children, Sherman Jr., was born while he was away. Minton's daughter Mary-Anne was born in 1923, and his second son, John, in 1925.

Political career

When Minton returned home he reopened his law practice and decided to enter politics. He ran for office in Indiana's 3rd congressional district, but lost the Democratic primary, despite significant campaigning and his war record. He lost to John Ewing, 6,502 votes to 3,170, second place in a field of five candidates. After the loss, he briefly joined the Indiana law firm of Stonsenburg and Weathers, two politically active lawyers, before moving to Miami, Florida, where he joined another firm, Shutts & Bowen. In January 1928, he left the Miami practice and returned to Stonsenburg and Weathers. He attempted to secure the Democratic nomination to run for Congress in 1930, but was again defeated, this time by the former state party chairman Eugene B. Crowe.

The following year, Minton became a local commander of the American Legion. The group had a large and active membership in the state at the time, and he used his position to encourage support of the Democratic Party agenda. Paul McNutt was the national commander, and the two men became political allies. When McNutt became governor in 1930, he offered Minton a position at the head of a new utility regulation commission. As commissioner, Minton successfully imposed regulations that reduced state telephone bills by a combined total of $525,000. The cuts received widespread media coverage, and Minton was credited in the reports with the success.

Senate campaign

Becoming popular among the party leadership during his two years as commissioner, Minton was encouraged by party leaders to run for the United States Senate in 1934. At the state Democratic Party Convention he ran against Earl Peters, a former chairman of the state party. With the support of McNutt, Minton won the nomination on the third ballot with 827 votes to Peters' 586.

Minton launched a statewide campaign in August 1934 and began delivering speeches in defense of the New Deal. He blamed Republicans for the conditions of the Great Depression. His opponent, incumbent Republican Senator Arthur Raymond Robinson, accused Minton of playing "Santa Claus" by trying to give everyone "presents". He also criticized Minton's support of the New Deal, which Robinson and Republicans called unconstitutional. Minton's initial campaign slogan was "You can't offer a hungry man the Constitution", a slogan he unveiled in a debate with Robinson in Corydon on August 11. He continued using the slogan, and on September 11, Minton delivered his infamous "You Cannot Eat the Constitution" speech, in which he concluded the urgent needs of the masses outweighed the need to uphold the Constitution. The speech backfired wildly and papers and opponents across the state called Minton's remarks traitorous. Minton stopped using the slogan and explained his position again using new terms, but his opponents continued to dog him over the issue. The Republicans also faulted popular governor McNutt and his reorganization of the government, and McNutt became more personally involved in the election. With the state party's more direct involvement, Minton won the election with 52 percent of the vote.

Lobby Investigation Committee

Minton took his Senate seat in January 1935. As a freshman, he sat in the back row of the chamber next to fellow freshman Harry Truman, and the pair quickly became friends. Minton was made a member of a special Lobby Investigation Committee chaired by Senator Hugo Black, that was set up to look into questionable lobbyist groups. According to professor of political science Linda C. Gugin, a Minton biographer, in practice the committee's investigations were politically motivated and directed against groups that were challenging New Deal legislation.

William Randolph Hearst, a prominent and wealthy media magnate, began using his newspapers to deride the committee's "reckless attacks on freedom". Minton led the effort to counter Hearst and delivered a speech criticizing his support of the Republican Party. In 1937, Senator Black was appointed to the Supreme Court and left the Senate, and Minton secured his post as chair of the committee. Minton immediately began a full-scale investigation of the media conglomerate controlled by Frank E. Gannett, accusing him of publishing Republican Party propaganda. For several weeks, Minton delivered speeches against Gannett in the Senate, and Gannett responded in kind in his newspapers. Minton finally introduced legislation that would have made it "illegal to publish information known to be false". Gannett, and a large number of allies in newspapers and on radio, immediately began to charge Minton and the Democratic Party with an assault on the freedom of the press. Minton's allies in Congress asked him to withdraw the bill because of its political repercussions, and he dropped the matter.

Minton tried again to expose what he believed to be Republican control of the media. He led the committee to target a newspaper with national circulation, Rural Progress. Minton accused the publishers of improperly accepting large sums of money from corporations and the editors of undue influence from this money. The owner of the paper, Maurive V. Renolds, was summoned before the committee for a hearing, where Minton demanded to know why he was accepting money from corporations. When Renolds asked his manager, Dr. Glen Frank, to help him answer the questions, Minton and fellow Democratic senators began to shout Dr. Frank down. As he was saying that the money from the corporations was for advertising in the magazine, Minton beat his gavel and yelled, "This committee doesn't intend to permit you to use this as a forum to air your Republican views."

Minton did not realize that Frank was also president of the University of Wisconsin, and soon suffered retaliation for the way he had treated Frank. Frank went on NBC radio stations around the country and lambasted Minton for his rudeness. He made lengthy arguments accusing Minton of attempting to violate the Bill of Rights. Minton was outraged, but the arguments had an effect among voters in Indiana. In 1938, he sought funding to launch a massive nationwide investigation of media conglomerates for proof of Republican interference in the press. Democratic Senator Edward R. Burke led an effort to defeat the measure and privately accused Minton of damaging the Democrats' cause, which led Minton to leave the Lobby Investigation Committee.

Minton was a fierce partisan during his time in the Senate, and regularly abused his opponents verbally. Democratic Senator Huey Long became one of Minton's favorite targets because of Long's often-threatened filibusters. During one of the filibusters, Long threatened to join the Republican Party. After most senators had left the chamber, Minton remained for several hours to periodically taunt Long. After tiring of the taunts, Long launched a rebuttal from the podium, calling Minton a vicious politician whose positions would cost Minton re-election. The exchange was unusual for its tone and later made national news.

Minton was involved in many such exchanges, including a particularly fierce one with Republican Senator Lester J. Dickinson in March 1936. Dickinson delivered a speech in the Senate castigating President Franklin D. Roosevelt for carrying out what he termed illegal and unconstitutional acts. Minton responded with a range of accusations, some personal, against Dickinson and his "political naivety".

Court packing

In 1936, the United States Supreme Court ruled the Agricultural Adjustment Act of 1933 unconstitutional. For the first time, Minton gave speeches criticizing the court for overriding the will of Congress. He accused the court of allowing itself to be influenced by political motives rather than the law. In response to the court ruling, Minton began drafting a bill which would allow the Supreme Court to declare a law unconstitutional only if seven out the nine justices supported the decision. In February 1937, before Minton introduced his bill, President Roosevelt introduced a plan of his own to deal with the Supreme Court. Roosevelt proposed adding more justices to the court and creating a mandatory retirement age; the changes would allow him to appoint an overwhelming majority to the court, more sympathetic to his agenda, ensuring the safety of legislation passed by his party.

Minton was pleased with Roosevelt's bill and quickly became its leading supporter in the Senate. The measure was placed in an omnibus bill designed to reform judicial salaries and districting, among many other measures. Republicans quickly discovered the court-packing provision and targeted the bill. At the time, Democrats held super-majorities in both chambers of Congress, and passage of the bill at first seemed assured. Minton's support of the bill helped him earn the position of Senate majority whip, allowing him to more effectively push for its passage. Minton delivered six radio addresses on behalf of his party in support of the bill, but public opinion could not be swayed in the Democrats' favor.

Minton received a death threat in the form of an envelope containing a shotgun shell and a message advising him to not vote for the court packing plan. Many Democrats, fearing their re-election prospects, joined with Republicans and defeated the bill. Minton was unhappy with the loss and it cost him considerable support among his voters, but as a result of his close connection with the bill and the leaders of his party, he gained more influence with the Democrats. When Justice Willis Van Devanter retired from the Court in May 1937, Minton was among the final three candidates considered by Roosevelt to succeed him, but the senator declined due to concerns over the impact his recent public criticisms of sitting Court members would have on his relationships with them.

Although Minton supported the Roosevelt Administration and became a regular guest at the White House, Minton broke with the president on some measures. He voted to override a presidential veto of a grant of $2.5 billion ($ billion in 2015 dollars) in bonus pay for World War I soldiers (Bonus Army). Minton also supported Republican Leonidas Dyer's anti-lynching bill, which Roosevelt feared would cost the party support in the southern states. He also supported an extension of the Hatch Act of 1939, a law that prevented federal employees from being forced to take part in state election campaigns, effectively lessening the influence of federal patronage.

As World War II neared, Minton took a cautious position on United States involvement. When the Soviet Union invaded Finland, Minton voted against granting a loan to Finland to help finance its defense efforts. He also opposed selling munitions and weapons to the Allies or the Axis powers. He advocated and supported expanding the American military and believed that American entry into the war was inevitable, but should be delayed as long as possible. He voted in favor of the Smith Act, which made it a crime to advocate the overthrow of the government, a law specifically targeted at communists and fascists in the United States. In his final year in office, there was considerable speculation in the press that Minton would be named to higher office by Roosevelt, including cabinet positions and the Supreme Court, but neither happened.

Re-election campaign

Minton ran for re-election to his Senate seat in 1940. McNutt was challenging Roosevelt for the Presidential nomination, forcing Minton to choose between the administration and his allies in the state party. Minton sided with Roosevelt, which cost him McNutt's and the Indiana Democratic Party machine's support in his re-election bid.

The Republican presidential candidate, Wendell Willkie was also a native of Indiana, and Minton faced a difficult challenge to win re-election. He referred to Willkie as a "sycophant for the rich and famous". Willkie never responded to Minton's taunts, leaving Minton's opponent in the Senate race, Raymond E. Willis, to do so in his stead. Willis had run for the Senate two years earlier but was defeated by Democrat Frederick Van Nuys. Willis faulted Minton on a range of topics but focused on the legislation Minton supported while in the Senate. Willis claimed that much of the legislation was unconstitutional and Minton's positions were detrimental to the nation. Minton responded by pointing out Willis's connections to wealthy corporations and accused him of not caring for the people. Minton's campaign focused on the achievements of the New Deal programs. He claimed farm income in Indiana had doubled since 1932, and highlighted the passage of the Old Age Pension laws. His support for conscription and military preparedness for the coming war proved unpopular with voters and cost him considerable support, but according to historian William Radcliff it was Willkie's favorite son status, which led many Hoosiers to vote Republican, that proved to be the election's deciding factor. Despite Minton's heavy campaigning, he lost the close election to Willis by 5,179 votes out of over 1.5 million cast.

Roosevelt won the 1940 presidential election. After Minton left office in January 1941, he was given a position in the Roosevelt administration as a reward for his loyalty during the court packing failure. He served as one of the president's advisers and a liaison between the White House and Congress. The extent of his duties is not fully known; Linda Gugin has speculated that he may have managed Roosevelt's patronage system. Minton was responsible for getting several officials appointed to high offices in the federal bureaucracy and numerous others appointed to lower ranking positions. He also convinced Roosevelt to support the creation of a Senate defense committee chaired by Truman, a position that brought Truman into the national spotlight and helped him gain the vice presidency.

Seventh Circuit

Appointment

On May 7, 1941, Roosevelt announced Minton's nomination to the Chicago-based United States Court of Appeals for the Seventh Circuit. Minton was confirmed unanimously by the Senate on May 12, 1941, and received his commission on May 22, 1941. Minton resigned from his post in the administration, but even after he began working on the court, Minton remained active in Democratic politics behind the scenes and was in regular correspondence with Roosevelt to make patronage suggestions.

Minton took his oath of office on May 29, 1941, but the court was in recess at the time. He took his seat when it returned to session on October 7, 1941. The court had the highest court load of all the appellate courts in the nation at that time, averaging 40 cases per judge annually. The men on the court were close friends, and Minton developed a particularly close friendship with Judge J. Earl Major; Major offered Minton financial assistance during his later illnesses. Major had been on the court for several years and held a judicial philosophy similar to Minton's. The two men regularly attended baseball games and were frequent guests in each other's homes.

World War II broke out shortly after Minton joined the court, creating a flood of cases in which legal precedent provided little guidance, including challenges to wartime measures, selective service laws, price controls, rationing and civil liberties. In the majority of these cases, the court affirmed the decisions of the district courts, but in several the court was required to establish a precedent. Minton stated on several occasions his personal preference to affirm the decisions of the lower courts. He believed that the court that heard the case and pronounced judgment was generally able to make a decision that was superior to appellate courts' decisions. He believed the appellate process should be reserved for the more serious cases and cases where the lower court had clearly made a mistake.

Jurisprudence

Minton was described by William Radcliff as a "faithful disciple of judicial restraint," an unexpected development when compared to his overtly partisan political career. Radcliff attributed Minton's conservative position to the distaste he developed for the courts when they overturned legislation passed while he was in the Senate. The courts' actions led him to strongly believe in the limited exercise of judicial power when evaluating the constitutionality of governmental conduct. Much of the recently passed New Deal legislation was being tried in the courts for constitutionality and enforcement, putting Minton in the uncommon position of adjudicating cases which depended on legislation he had helped write.

During his time on the Seventh Circuit, Minton authored 253 of the court's opinions, including twelve dissenting opinions. Some of his opinions won praise; the editors of Tax Magazine commented favorably on Minton's opinions on tax law, calling them "direct Hoosier logic". Other court reporting papers made similar comments, applauding the manner in which he turned complex issues to simple questions that could easily be understood.

In the cases of Sunkist v. Sunkist and Quaker Oats Co. v. General Mills, the court held that it was possible for different companies to use the same brand and product name as long as they produced dissimilar products. In another case, the court set a short-lived precedent allowing companies to artificially raise prices in local markets if the purpose was to artificially lower prices in another market to remain competitive. After Minton joined the United States Supreme Court, the decision was appealed to that body; Minton recused himself from the case, which the court decided to overturn. In another decision, Minton was in the majority that ruled under the Sherman Antitrust Act that the New York Great Atlantic and Pacific Tea Company was a monopoly, ordering the company to break up its grocery business. Minton was also in the majority in several cases filed to enforce decisions made by the National Labor Relations Board, usually to end worker strikes.

In the case of United States v. Knauer, the government denied the wife of a United States citizen entry into the country because of her possible ties to Nazism. In a much-criticized majority opinion which Minton co-authored with Judge Major, he stated that the "alien did not have any legal right—[her] status was a political decision to be made by officials in government." Many liberals condemned the court at the time of the decision. The ruling was upheld by the Supreme Court in a 1946 appeal.

One of Minton's favorite cases was that of Modernistic Candies, Inc. v. Federal Trade Commission. The candy company produced a one-cent gumball dispenser in which almost all the gumballs were the same color. A few different-colored gumballs were included which, when dispensed, entitled the purchaser to a prize from the merchant who owned the machine. The FTC had an injunction put in place barring the company from producing the machines because they claimed it violated anti-gambling laws. Minton wrote the majority opinion and sided with the majority to keep the injunction in place, but dryly mocked the counsel for the defense and the gambling law, stating:

Counsel for the petitioner discussed at great length from a sociological point of view, of the age-old problem of the gambling instinct in the human being. According to his analysis, gambling pervades our entire economic system; thus insurance contracts are a gamble, stock and grain exchange transactions are gambles, and the farmer's dependence on weather is a gamble. Counsel's attempt to apply this analysis to the present case left us cold and unimpressed. He even reminded us that our great idol, Mr. Chief Justice John Marshall, in his day attended the horse races and wagered with his clergyman. In fact, they ran a book. As indicating how times have changed and how even our coarse nature has yielded to the protecting care of governmental policy, we confess we do not even know a bookmaker, clerical or otherwise, and our passes to the beautiful race tracks around Chicago lie in our desk unused.

Minton often lamented that he was required to "pronounce the law as it was written, but on no occasion [c]ould he make the law."

Clemency board and failing health

After Roosevelt's death and Truman's succession to the Presidency, Minton continued offering advice to the new administration on a range of topics, including patronage and political maneuvering. Truman appointed Minton as head of the War Department Clemency Board, a panel of judges charged with overseeing reviews of decisions made by the courts-martial. The panel met every two weeks which, along with his responsibilities on the circuit court, kept Minton very busy and afforded him little rest, leading to a deterioration in his health. While yachting with President Truman on Memorial Day in 1945, Truman asked Minton to accept an appointment to the position of Solicitor General of the United States. Minton declined because of his health, but he told Truman he would be interested in a seat on the Supreme Court.

In September 1945, Minton suffered a heart attack while in Washington; he was hospitalized for three months at Walter Reed Hospital. After returning to work, he was forced to rest regularly due to gradually worsening anemia, and he sought to lessen his workload. To further complicate his health, on August 5, 1949, Minton tripped over a stone in his yard and broke his leg. The injury forced him to walk with a cane for the remainder of his life.

Supreme Court

Nomination and confirmation

At a September 15, 1949, news conference, Truman announced Minton's nomination to the Supreme Court, succeeding the late Justice Wiley Rutledge. Minton had already privately accepted the nomination several days earlier after a telephone conversation with Truman. Truman touted Minton's extensive law education and his years of experience on the circuit courts as the reason for his nomination.

News of Minton's appointment received mixed reviews nationally. The New York Times said that Truman had allowed personal and political friendship to influence his choice. The New Republic said "the President is again reverting to his deplorable habit of choosing men for high post because they happen to be his friends...." The Washington Post raised questions about Minton's ability to be confirmed by the Senate due to the power many of his foes held in the body. The Indianapolis Star offered a more sympathetic opinion, pointing out Minton's qualifications and the pride Indiana could take in having a native on the Supreme Court. The article noted that he would be the most educated justice on the court, should he be confirmed.

Indiana Senator William E. Jenner led opponents of Minton's nomination, including some of Minton's old foes, in an attempt to bring him before the body for hearings. Minton wrote a letter to the Senate Judiciary Committee answering several of their questions, but refused to submit himself to a hearing. He mentioned his broken leg and hinted in his letter that it could be detrimental to his health to travel in his condition. He also stated that, as a sitting judge and former member of the Senate, it would be improper for him submit to a hearing. Minton responded to questions over his past support for the 1937 court packing scheme  in the letter, declaring that as the Senate leader at the time of his scheme he had a right and duty to support the scheme, but as a federal judge his role had now changed to that of a referee rather than a player. Although hearings had occurred irregularly in the past, it was not customary at that time to have a hearing on a nominee. During an absence of Jenner's, Minton's allies worked to have the hearing request dropped. The Judiciary Committee held a single hearing on September 27, 1949 on his nomination. His nomination faced intense questioning from Republican Senators on his past support for the failed 1937 court packing scheme. The Senate Judiciary Committee voted 9–2 on October 3, 1949 to forward his nomination to the full Senate with a favorable report. On October 4, 1949, Senator Homer S. Ferguson attempted to have the nomination returned to committee but the motion failed, 42–45. The long debate over Minton's appointment focused on his partisanship, support of the court packing plan during his time in the Senate, and poor health. His opponents launched numerous delaying tactics; the Senate session before the vote to confirm Minton lasted until midnight. His confirmation was approved 48–16 on October 4, 1949, and he was sworn into office on October 12. To date, Minton remains the last member of Congress, sitting or former, to be appointed to the United States Supreme Court, and he is the only native of Indiana to be appointed to the court.

Judicial restraint

Minton's central judicial philosophy was to ascertain and uphold the original intent of legislation. He continued to take a broad view of governmental powers, demonstrated in his dissenting vote in the case of Youngstown Sheet & Tube Co. v. Sawyer, which ruled unconstitutional President Truman's wartime seizure of several steel mills to avert a workers' strike. Of all the cases in which Minton was involved, he disagreed most with the Youngstown decision and "went into a tirade" during the conference where the decision was made. He argued that there "could be no vacant spot in power when the security of the nation is at stake." Despite his strong protest, he could not influence the Court to permit the president to seize the plants without congressional approval. Minton joined with Chief Justice Fred M. Vinson and Justice Stanley Forman Reed in the dissenting opinion that the President had the authority through the war powers clause of the constitution.

Minton abhorred racial segregation and provided a solid vote to strike down the school segregation practices at issue in 1954's landmark case of Brown v. Board of Education; it was among the few decisions in which he sided against the government. According to William Radcliff, the majority opinion authored by Minton in the 1953 case Barrows v. Jackson was his most skillfully written opinion. He framed the complex question of the case as: "Can a racially restrictive covenant be enforced at law by a suit for damages against a co-covenantor who allegedly broke the covenant?" The Court decided the answer in the negative.

In the area of civil liberties, Minton adhered to the doctrine of "fundamental fairness", a test established by the Supreme Court in 1937. In one decision, Minton stated that the right of free speech was not an absolute right, and could be regulated so as not to violate the rights of others. In United States v. Rabinowitz, Minton wrote the Court's opinion upholding a lower court ruling which allowed police to search automobiles without a warrant, provided there was probable cause to justify the search.

Minton voted to uphold anticommunist legislation during the period of the "red scare", siding with the majority in 1951's Dennis v. United States, which upheld the conviction of the leader of the US Communist Party. During the same period, the Court was split over the legality of governmental loyalty tests. Many agencies had programs in place to ensure that members of the government were not communists. Minton's vote proved to be the deciding factor in cases regarding loyalty tests. In the case of Bailey v. Richardson, Minton's vote upheld the legality of the loyalty tests, while in the decision he authored in the case of Joint Anti-Fascist Refugee Committee v. McGrath, he voted to uphold the plaintiff's position that he had been terminated illegally because of his support of fascist ideology. Minton's position gradually shifted to allowing the loyalty tests to take place, and in Adler v. Board of Ed. of City of New York he wrote the majority opinion allowing the tests and upholding New York's Feinberg Law. This proved to be the most important vote as it allowed the tests to be given with only minimal suspicion of a person's disloyalty to the government.

Because of Minton's previous Congressional partisanship, many liberals believed he would support their positions when on the Court. Throughout his tenure, Minton regularly disappointed them, leading many to rail against him. A lawyer writing for the New Jersey Law Journal labeled Minton a "spokesman against freedom", calling him "a man of conspicuous judicial shortcomings, whose votes against civil liberties exceeded those of any other man on the Court, and who wrote comparatively few opinions of other kinds." Linda Gugin pointed out that Minton was a disappointment to liberals because he consistently chose order over freedom. Gugin also concludes that Minton had the strongest commitment to judicial restraint and ideological neutrality of any justice, past or present.

Politics

Although Minton was on the Supreme Court, he remained casually involved in Democratic internal politics. He wrote Truman several letters criticizing Justices Robert H. Jackson and Hugo Black, referring to Black as a demagogue. He also offered advice on dealing with Republican opposition in the Senate. In a 1954 letter, after Truman left office, he urged Truman to help focus public attention on the economy and away from communism, a threat he claimed the Republicans were exaggerating to avoid confronting their own problems.

After Truman's withdrawal from the 1952 presidential campaign, Minton made remarks indicating he had advised Truman to stay out of the contested New Hampshire primary election to begin with. In August 1956, a reporter asked Minton about his preferred candidate in the upcoming presidential election. Minton answered, "I have great confidence in Adlai Stevenson." He also remarked that Dwight D. Eisenhower was politically handicapped. Minton was lambasted in the media for his endorsement, which he attempted to retract a few days later after being advised to do so by other members of the Court.

Regular dissenter

Truman's other appointees to the Court provided consistent conservative votes, and during Minton's first years on the Court it was returned to the conservatism of the William Howard Taft era. While on the Court, Minton transformed from a New Deal senator into an almost reactionary judge as an ally of Justice Felix Frankfurter. Empirical coding of votes shows that Minton was the most conservative justice on the Court during his first year, and remained in the conservative half of the court for the duration of his career.

Minton did not enjoy the limited influence of his judicial role in the later years of his term, when he was more frequently in the minority in voting on cases. After the deaths of Chief Justice Fred M. Vinson and Justice Robert Jackson, Minton found himself with little support for many of his opinions, which led him to begin considering retirement.

The shifting position of the Court led to personal animosity between members of its two wings. Despite his disappointment over the Court's positions on some issues, Minton remained popular among his colleagues on the Court as he didn't take sides in their personal disagreements; he proved a soothing presence during a period marked by bitter personal feuds between strong personalities such as William O. Douglas and Felix Frankfurter.

Minton informed Eisenhower of his intention to retire in a letter on September 7, 1956, in which he dryly stated his retirement was authorized by law. Eisenhower responded with a brief note wishing him a happy retirement. Although he did not tell the president, Minton informed the members of the Court that his duties were too taxing on his health. His anemia had steadily worsened, slowing him physically and mentally. Minton served as a Justice until October 15, 1956, retiring after 7 years and 3 days of service. He was succeeded by William J. Brennan Jr.

Later life

Retirement

Announcing his departure, Minton remarked, "There will be more interest in who will succeed me than in my passing. I'm an echo." Despite the health difficulties, Minton regretted his decision almost immediately.

Minton returned to his New Albany home, where he took a much lighter workload. He gave occasional lectures at Indiana University and continued to give public speeches from time to time. For several years after retiring from the Supreme Court, Minton occasionally accepted assignments to serve temporarily on one of the lower federal courts. He received an honorary doctorate degree from the University of Louisville. He took many trips around the United States, and two trips to Europe. In England, he received an honorary doctorate from Oxford University in 1956.

Despite his failing health, Minton remained active in the Democratic Party. He was most concerned with President Eisenhower, who he believed was incompetent. He remained in regular correspondence with Truman, and the two met on several occasions at Democratic Party functions.

Death and legacy

In late March 1965, Minton was admitted to Floyd Memorial Hospital in New Albany, where it was found he was suffering internal bleeding. He died in his sleep early in the morning of April 9. Minton's wife was Roman Catholic; his funeral was held at the now-defunct Holy Trinity Catholic Church and was attended by many dignitaries, including several sitting members of the Supreme Court, the governors of Indiana and Kentucky, and several members of Congress. He was buried in the Holy Trinity Cemetery, on Green Valley Road in New Albany, next to Leo Receveur. Minton himself was nominally Catholic and had shunned Christianity for most of his life; he only began to occasionally attend mass following his retirement. He left most of his personal papers and judicial records to the Truman Presidential Library.

Minton is the eponym of the Sherman Minton Bridge, which carries Interstate 64 across the Ohio River, connecting western Louisville, Kentucky with New Albany, Indiana. Minton attended the dedication of the bridge at a 1962 ceremony. He is also the namesake of the annual Sherman Minton Moot Court Competition, held at the Indiana University Maurer School of Law. He is also honored (with Indiana Senator Homer E. Capehart)—in the "Brutalist" style designed by Woollen, Molzan and Partners and with architectural art by Milton Glaser—in the centrally located Minton-Capehart Federal Building on Indiana World War Memorial Plaza in Indianapolis. A bronze bust of Minton was created and put on display in the Indiana Statehouse.

While some writers like Linda Gugin and legal historian William Radcliff have given high praise to Minton's logic in his written opinions, they point out that his positions had little long-term impact. Other legal historians, like Bernard Schwartz, have a more negative opinion of Minton's judicial career. Schwartz wrote that Minton "was below mediocrity as a Justice. His opinions, relatively few for his tenure, are less than third rate, characterized by their cavalier approach to complicated issues." Schwartz went on to say, "he ranks near the bottom of any list of Justices." Most of the precedents Minton helped establish were overturned by the Warren Court in the years immediately following his retirement. In total he wrote sixty-seven majority opinions along with several of the dissenting opinions. Gugin authored a work in rebuttal to Schwartz's harsh critique, saying that Minton's rulings were "predictable based on the principles of deference, precedent, and strict interpretation"; she attributed his poor ranking to the bias of reviewers in favor of judicial activism.

Minton's time on the court marked the end of a transitory period in the judiciary. Since Minton, justices have tended to serve increasingly longer terms on the court, which has had strong political science implications on the Supreme Court. The growing concept of judicial non-partisanship became the norm in American politics after Minton—he was the last member of Congress to be appointed to the Court. Linda Gugin and Professor James St. Clair have noted that the federal courts have lost a valuable point of view by not having experienced legislators among their ranks.

Minton played an important role behind the scenes of the Court as a peacemaker between its two opposing factions. These attempts to keep the peace led Justice Frankfurter to remark that while Minton would never be remembered as a great justice, he would be remembered as a great colleague by his fellow justices.

Electoral history

See also

List of justices of the Supreme Court of the United States
List of United States Supreme Court justices by time in office
United States Supreme Court cases during the Vinson Court
United States Supreme Court cases during the Warren Court
 List of law clerks of the Supreme Court of the United States (Seat 3)

Bibliography

Footnotes

Notes

References

 .

; (Spring 1959): pp. 377–424.

Further reading

Abraham, Henry J., Justices and Presidents: A Political History of Appointments to the Supreme Court. (3rd ed., Oxford University Press, 1992). .
Atkinson, David N. "From New Deal Liberal to Supreme Court Conservative: The Metamorphosis of Justice Sherman Minton" Washington University Law Quarterly (1975): pp. 361–394.

Frank, John P., The Justices of the United States Supreme Court: Their Lives and Major Opinions (Leon Friedman and Fred L. Israel, editors) (New York: Chelsea House, 1995) , .

Martin, Fenton S. and Goehlert, Robert U., The U.S. Supreme Court: A Bibliography, (Congressional Quarterly Books, 1990). .
Urofsky, Melvin I., The Supreme Court Justices: A Biographical Dictionary (New York: Garland, 1994). ; .

External links

 
 
Photograph, Sherman Minton Home, Georgetown, Indiana.
Sherman Minton Senate identification card with signature, University of Louisville.
Photograph, Sherman Minton grave site

1890 births
1965 deaths
20th-century American judges
Converts to Roman Catholicism
Democratic Party United States senators from Indiana
Indiana Democrats
Indiana lawyers
Indiana University alumni
Judges of the United States Court of Appeals for the Seventh Circuit
New Albany High School (Indiana) alumni
United States Army personnel of World War I
People from New Albany, Indiana
United States Army officers
United States court of appeals judges appointed by Franklin D. Roosevelt
United States federal judges appointed by Harry S. Truman
Justices of the Supreme Court of the United States
University of Paris alumni
Yale Law School alumni
Catholics from Indiana